Jourdain is a station on line 11 of the Paris Métro in the 19th and 20th arrondissements. It is named after the nearby rue du Jourdain, referring to a nearby church dedicated to Saint John the Baptist, who baptised Christ in the Jordan River.

History 
The station opened as part of the original section of the line from Châtelet to Porte des Lilas on 28 April 1935.

As part of modernization works for the extension of the line to Rosny-Bois-Perrier in 2023 for the Grand Paris Express, the station will be closed from 2 February 2021 to 12 April 2021 to raise its platform levels and its surface tiled to accommodate the new rolling stock that will be used (MP 14) to accommodate the expected increase passengers and to improve the station's accessibility. An additional entrance was also added in January 2022 from the eastern end of the platforms to allow passengers to enter from both ends of the platforms.

In 2019, the station was used by 3,029,314 passengers, making it the 171st busiest of the Métro network out of 302 stations.

In 2020, the station was used by 1,683,473 passengers amidst the COVID-19 pandemic, making it the 151st busiest of the Métro network out of 305 stations.

Passenger services

Access 
The station has 3 entrances:

 Entrance 1: rue du Jourdain
 Entrance 2: rue Lassus
 Entrance 3: rue de Belleville

Station layout

Platforms 
Jourdain has a standard configuration with 2 tracks surrounded by 2 side platforms.

Other connections 
The station is also served by line 20 of the RATP bus network, and at night, by lines N12 and N23 of the Noctilien bus network.

Gallery

References

 Roland, Gérard (2003). Stations de métro. D’Abbesses à Wagram. Éditions Bonneton.

Paris Métro line 11
Paris Métro stations in the 19th arrondissement of Paris
Paris Métro stations in the 20th arrondissement of Paris
Railway stations in France opened in 1935